Bon Secour, Bon Secours, or Bonsecours (French for "good help") may refer to:

Bon Secours Sisters, a Catholic charity group

Belgium 
, a village in the municipality of Péruwelz, Hainaut province

Canada
Bonsecours, Quebec
Bonsecours Market, opened 1847 near the Notre-Dame-de-Bon-Secours Chapel (Montreal)
Notre-Dame-de-Bonsecours, Quebec

France
Bonsecours, a commune in Normandy region

Ireland 
Bon Secours Health System, the largest private hospital network in the Republic of Ireland
Bon Secours Hospital, Cork, a private hospital in County Cork, Ireland
Bon Secours Hospital, Dublin, a private hospital in Glasnevin, Dublin, Ireland
Bon Secours Hospital, Galway, a private hospital in County Galway, Ireland
Bon Secours Hospital, Tralee, a private hospital in County Kerry, Ireland
Bon Secours Mother and Baby home, Tuam, a home for unmarried mothers and their children that became the focus of a scandal in 2014

North America 
Bon Secour, Alabama, a small town near southeast Mobile Bay
Bon Secours Health System (USA), a Maryland-based Catholic healthcare system
Bon Secour National Wildlife Refuge, a set of 5 wildlife areas along the Alabama Gulf Coast
Notre-Dame-de-Bon-Secours Chapel, a 1771 church in Montreal, Canada
Notre Dame de Bon Secours, patroness of the state of Louisiana
Bon Secours DePaul Medical Center, a hospital in Norfolk, Virginia
Bon Secours Mary Immaculate Hospital, a hospital in Virginia
Bon Secours Maryview Medical Center, a hospital in Portsmouth, Virginia
Bon Secours Memorial Regional Medical Center, a hospital in Virginia
Bon Secours Richmond Community Hospital, a hospital in Virginia
Bon Secours St. Francis Medical Center, a hospital in Virginia
Bon Secours St. Mary's Hospital, a hospital in Richmond, Virginia
Bon Secours Wellness Arena, a multipurpose arena in Greenville, South Carolina